Toronto is an unincorporated area and civic address community in Queens County, Prince Edward Island, Canada. It is part of Lot 23 in Grenville Parish.

History
The settlement, originally named Martin, had a post office from 1891 to 1914 with Moses Martin as the first postmaster.  The settlement was renamed Toronto in 1966 and became a civic address community in 2000.

References 

Communities in Queens County, Prince Edward Island